Indole-3-acetaldehyde belongs to the class of organic compounds known as indoles. These are compounds containing an indole moiety, which consists of pyrrole ring fused to benzene to form 2,3-benzopyrrole.

Indole-3-acetaldehyde is a substrate for retina-specific copper amine oxidase, aldehyde dehydrogenase X (mitochondrial), amine oxidase B, amiloride-sensitive amine oxidase, aldehyde dehydrogenase (mitochondrial), fatty aldehyde dehydrogenase, 4-trimethylaminobutyraldehyde dehydrogenase, aldehyde dehydrogenase (dimeric NADP-preferring), aldehyde dehydrogenase family 7 member A1, amine oxidase A, aldehyde dehydrogenase 1A3 and membrane copper amine oxidase.

References

External links 
 Indoleacetaldehyde (HMDB01190)

Auxins
Indoles
Aldehydes